Carl Gottsche may refer to:

 Carl Moritz Gottsche (1808–1892), German physician and bryologist
 Carl Christian Gottsche (1855–1909), his son, German geologist